Gendob may refer to:
Cəndov, a village in the Ismailli Rayon of Azerbaijan
Gəndov, several places in Azerbaijan